The 7th Army Corps was an Army corps in the Imperial Russian Army.

Composition
13th Infantry Division
34th Infantry Division

Part of
8th Army: 1914
3rd Army: 1914
8th Army: 1915
11th Army: 1915-1916
4th Army: 1916-1917
6th Army: 1917

Commanders
1895-1900: Pavel Grigorievich Dukmasov
1905: Lieutenant general baron Alexander Meller-Zakomelsky
1909: General of the Cavalry Vladimir Viktorovich Sakharov
1912-1916: Eduard Ekk

References

Corps of the Russian Empire
Military units and formations established in 1877
Military units and formations disestablished in 1918
1877 establishments in the Russian Empire